Corallimorphus niwa is a species of corals in the genus Corallimorphus. It was classified by Fautin in 2011. Corallimorphus niwa lives in marine habitats.

References

Corallimorphidae
Animals described in 2011